Bossey Ecumenical Institute is the ecumenical institute of the World Council of Churches. It was founded in 1946. The director of the Institute is Ioan Sauca. Degrees and other academic awards are accredited by the University of Geneva.

It is situated in Switzerland at the Chateau de Bossey, between the villages of Bogis-Bossey and Céligny, near Geneva.

The institute offers a variety of academic programs and courses in theology, including graduate-level programs in ecumenical studies, interreligious dialogue, and pastoral ministry.

Notable alumni 

 Nerses Pozapalian

External links
 

World Council of Churches
International Christian organizations
Christian organizations established in 1946
International organisations based in Switzerland